Appena prima di partire (en: Just before departing) is the second studio album by Italian Pop duo Zero Assoluto. The album was released on 2 March 2007, during the Sanremo Festival's time.

Track listing

 "Ora che ci sei" – 3:52
 "Appena prima di partire" – 3:21
 "Meglio così" – 3:21
 "Sei parte di me" – 3:00
 "Quello che mi davi tu" – 3:03
 "Svegliarsi la mattina" – 3:44
 "Certe cose non cambiano" – 3:10
 "Non voltarti mai" – 3:59
 "Scappare" – 3:30
 "Seduto qua" – 3:57
 "Semplicemente" – 6:08

Singles
 The album's lead single is "Semplicemente", released mid-year 2005. The single subsequently became a commercial and broadcast success, reaching #3 in Italy
 The second single is "Svegliarsi la mattina". It was released on February 28, 2006, and the duo performed the song at the Sanremo Festival, where they were #2 in the "Group" category.
 "Sei parte di me" is the third single was released on June 30, 2006. The song reached #1 on the Italian Chart, in its third week.
 The fourth single was "Appena prima di partire", released on February 27, 2007, during the Sanremo Festival. At the Sanremo Festival, during the "Serata dei Duetti (Evening of Duets)", the singers were joined by Nelly Furtado. The song was subsequently re-released in Germany on May 11, 2008, as "Win or Lose", featuring Nelly Furtado. Both versions were released only as digital downloads.
 "Meglio Così", also available only as a digital download, is the fifth and final single from album, released in the first half of 2007. The singers performed the song at Festivalbar. The singers quote the book, "Ho Voglia di Te", in the song.

2007 albums
Zero Assoluto albums